The 2013 IPC Alpine Skiing World Championships was an international disability sport alpine skiing event held in La Molina ski resort in Spain from 18 to 27 February 2013. The Championship is held biannually by the International Paralympic Committee (IPC) and is the largest event of its type outside the Winter Paralympics.

Skiers competed in sitting, standing or visually impaired classification categories in Downhill, Giant Slalom, Slalom, Super-G, Super Combined and Team events.

Over 118 skiers competed, with France finishing the Championship on top of the medal table with the most gold medals and Canada finishing with the highest total medals won (14).

Opening ceremony
The opening ceremony was held on the 18 February.

Events

Men

Women

Medals table

Participating nations
Over 118 participants from 29 nations competed.

Classifications
Skiers compete in sitting, standing or visually impaired events, depending on their classification of disability.

Standing
LW2 – single leg amputation above the knee
LW3 – double leg amputation below the knee, mild cerebral palsy, or equivalent impairment
LW4 – single leg amputation below the knee
LW5/7 – double arm amputation
LW6/8 – single arm amputation
LW9 – amputation or equivalent impairment of one arm and one leg

Sitting
LW 10 – paraplegia with no or some upper abdominal function and no functional sitting balance
LW 11 – paraplegia with fair functional sitting balance
LW 12 – double leg amputation above the knees, or paraplegia with some leg function and good sitting balance

Visually impaired
B1 – no functional vision
B2 – up to ca 3–5% functional vision
B3 – under 10% functional vision

References

 Winter Sport Classification, Canadian Paralympic Committee

External links

 official site
 IPC Alpine Skiing
 World Championships – official results
 ParalympicSport.TV

World Para Alpine Skiing Championships
IPC Alpine Skiing World Championships
IPC Alpine Skiing World Championships